St Bartholomew's Church, Masshouse Lane, Digbeth, Birmingham was a Church of England parish church in Birmingham, England.

History

The site for the church was given by John Jennens on land at Masshouse formerly occupied by the Roman Catholic Chapel and convent in 1687, and the building was designed by William Hiorne and David Hiorne and opened as a chapel of ease to St Martin in the Bull Ring in 1749. It was enlarged in 1840-1841  and it became a parish church in its own right in 1847. A previous attempt at this had failed in 1772. It was restored in 1893 at a cost of £800.

Part of its parish was taken in 1869 to form the parish of St Gabriel's Church, Deritend.

The church was closed in 1937, damaged in an air raid in 1942 and demolished in 1943. Part of the parish was assigned to Bishop Ryder Church, Birmingham.

Organ

The organ was installed in 1806 by George Pike England. A specification of the organ can be found on the National Pipe Organ Register.

References

Church of England church buildings in Birmingham, West Midlands
Churches completed in 1749
18th-century Church of England church buildings
Bartholomew
Bartholomew